The Charlotte 49ers softball team represents University of North Carolina at Charlotte in NCAA Division I college softball.  The team participates in the Conference USA. The 49ers are currently led by head coach Ashley Chastain. The team plays its home games at Sue M. Daughtridge Stadium located on the university's campus.

References

 
Conference USA softball